Yegoryevsky (masculine), Yegoryevskaya (feminine), or Yegoryevskoye (neuter) is the name of several rural localities in Russia:
Yegoryevsky (rural locality), a selo in Kozelsky District of Kaluga Oblast
Yegoryevskoye, Kaliningrad Oblast, a settlement in Dobrinsky Rural Okrug of Guryevsky District of Kaliningrad Oblast
Yegoryevskoye, Moscow Oblast, a village in Nudolskoye Rural Settlement of Klinsky District of Moscow Oblast
Yegoryevskoye, Knyagininsky District, Nizhny Novgorod Oblast, a selo in Ananyevsky Selsoviet of Knyagininsky District of Nizhny Novgorod Oblast
Yegoryevskoye, Lyskovsky District, Nizhny Novgorod Oblast, a selo in Kislovsky Selsoviet of Lyskovsky District of Nizhny Novgorod Oblast
Yegoryevskoye, Novosibirsk Oblast, a selo in Maslyaninsky District of Novosibirsk Oblast
Yegoryevskoye, Oryol Oblast, a village in Znamensky Selsoviet of Znamensky District of Oryol Oblast
Yegoryevskoye, Tver Oblast, a village in Kashinsky District of Tver Oblast
Yegoryevskoye, Vladimir Oblast, a village in Alexandrovsky District of Vladimir Oblast
Yegoryevskoye, Yaroslavl Oblast, a village in Ninorovsky Rural Okrug of Uglichsky District of Yaroslavl Oblast

See also
Yegoryevsk, a town in Moscow Oblast